The Land Registration Act 1936 (LRA) was an Act of Parliament in the United Kingdom that amended the Land Registration Act 1925, concerning land registration in England and Wales. It has largely been repealed, and updated in the Land Registration Act 2002.

The subsequent Commons Registration Act 1965 made reference to the Land Registration Acts 1925 and 1936.

See also
 Land Registry Act 1862

References

United Kingdom Acts of Parliament 1936
English property law
Acts of the Parliament of the United Kingdom concerning England and Wales
Land registration